Shasta or Shastan may refer to:

Native American
 Shasta Costa, a people group native to southwestern Oregon
 Shasta language, extinct language of the Shasta people
 Shasta people, a people group native to northern California and southern Oregon
 Shastan languages, extinct family of languages

Geography and locations

California, United States
 Shasta, California, a former mining town (west of present-day Redding, California), now abandoned
 Mount Shasta, California, a city located southwest of Mount Shasta
 Mount Shasta, part of the Cascade Range in California
 Shasta County, California, named for the mountain
 Shasta Lake, California, a city near Shasta Lake
 Shasta Lake, the reservoir behind Shasta Dam
 Shasta Dam, on the Sacramento River in California
 Shasta River, a river near Mount Shasta
 Shasta Springs, a former resort on the Sacramento River
 Shasta State Historic Park, the current state park at the site of Shasta
 State of Shasta, part of an 1854 proposal to partition California into three states

Iran
 Shasta, Iran, a village in Mazandaran Province, Iran
 Shastan, Iran, a village in Razavi Khorasan Province, Iran

People
 Shasta Averyhardt, an American golfer on the LPGA
 Shasta Groene, a young girl from Coeur d'Alene, Idaho abducted by Joseph E. Duncan III

Products
 Shasta (soft drink), a soft drink brand
 Shasta, a former Procter & Gamble shampoo brand
 Shasta travel trailers, an American brand built between 1941–2004

Arts, entertainment, and media
 Shasta (Narnia), the main character in C. S. Lewis' novel The Horse and His Boy (1954)
 "Shasta", the seventh track on singer-songwriter Vienna Teng's album Warm Strangers (2004)
 "Shasta Beast", the twelfth track on the Eagles of Death Metal release Death by Sexy (2006)
 Shasta Fay Hepworth, major character in the Paul Thomas Anderson film Inherent Vice (2014), based on Thomas Pynchon's eponymous novel 
 Shasta McNasty, a television sitcom on UPN. The name was shortened to Shasta before season one ended. 
 Shasta of the Wolves, a 1919 feral child novel and its title character by Olaf Baker
 Shasta, a Siberian Husky in Snow Buddies

Other uses
 Shasta (deity), a Hindu deity
 Shasta (mascot), the name of the University of Houston's mascot
 SHASTA, the callsign for Lynx Aviation, based in Denver, Colorado
 Leucanthemum × superbum or Shasta daisy, a flower
 Shasta Publishers, a 1950s US science fiction publishing imprint
 USS Shasta, either of two ammunition replenishment ships of the United States Navy